The 2009 Status Athens Open was a professional tennis tournament played on outdoor clay courts. It was part of the 2009 ATP Challenger Tour. It took place in Athens, Greece between 6 and 12 April 2009.

Singles entrants

Seeds

Rankings are as of March 23, 2009.

Other entrants
The following players received wildcards into the singles main draw:
  Konstantinos Economidis
  Alexandros-Ferdinandos Georgoudas
  Alex Jakupovic
  Dimitris Kleftakos

The following players received entry from the qualifying draw:
  Leonardo Azzaro
  Jan Hájek
  Dušan Lojda
  Joseph Sirianni

Champions

Men's singles

 Rui Machado def.  Daniel Muñoz de la Nava, 6–3, 7–6(4)

Men's doubles

 Rameez Junaid /  Philipp Marx def.  Jesse Huta Galung /  Rui Machado, 6–4, 6–3

References
2009 Draws
ITF search 

Status Athens Open
2009 in Greek tennis
Status Athens Open